William John Kenneth Diplock, Baron Diplock,  (8 December 1907 – 14 October 1985) was a British barrister and judge who served as a lord of appeal in ordinary between 1968 and until his death in 1985. Appointed to the English High Court in 1956 and the Court of Appeal five years later, Diplock made important contributions to the development of constitutional and public law as well as many other legal fields. A frequent choice for governmental inquiries, he is also remembered for proposing the creation of the eponymous juryless Diplock courts. Of him, Lord Rawlinson of Ewell wrote that "to his generation Diplock was the quintessential man of the law".

Early life and legal career
Kenneth Diplock was born in South Croydon, the son of solicitor William John Hubert Diplock and his wife Christine Joan Brooke. He was educated at Whitgift School in Croydon and University College, Oxford, where he read chemistry and graduated with a second-class degree in 1929. He was Secretary of the Oxford Union for a term in 1929. He later become an honorary fellow of University College in 1958.

Diplock was called to the bar by the Middle Temple in 1932. After two years in the chambers of Sir Valentine Holmes, KC, he transferred to the chambers of Sir Leslie Scott, KC. In 1939, he left legal practice for serve in the Second World War; in 1941, he joined the Royal Air Force, in which he reached the rank of squadron leader. From 1939 to 1948, he was secretary to the Master of the Rolls, Lord Greene. 

Returning to the bar in 1945, Diplock was made a King's Counsel in 1948, at the early age of 41. He acquired a large practice in commercial work and in advisory work for Commonwealth governments. He was Recorder of Oxford from 1951 to 1956.

Judicial career 

In 1956, Diplock was appointed to the High Court of Justice, receiving the customary knighthood. Assigned to the Queen's Bench Division, he was appointed President of the Restrictive Practices Court in January 1961. He was promoted to be a lord justice of appeal in October 1961, and was sworn of the Privy Council. He was chairman of the Security Commission from 1971 to 1982

He became a Lord of Appeal in Ordinary on 30 September 1968 and was elevated as a life peer with the title Baron Diplock, of Wansford in the County of Huntingdon and Peterborough to the House of Lords. 

He became the senior Law Lord upon the retirement of Lord Wilberforce in 1982. He resigned his seniority in October 1984 but remained a Law Lord until his death the following year. 

As Lord Diplock, he chaired a commission set up in 1972 to consider legal measures against terrorism in Northern Ireland, which led to the establishment of the juryless Diplock courts with which his name is now often associated.

In September 1985, Lord Diplock sat as a judge for the last time, in a special sitting of the Judicial Committee of the Privy Council during the Long Vacation for an urgent civil case from Trinidad and Tobago. Severely ill from emphysema, Diplock came to court from the hospital in a wheelchair and with an oxygen cylinder.

At the time of his death, Lord Diplock was the longest serving law lord as well as the last serving superior judge to not be covered the mandatory retirement age of 75 introduced by the Judicial Pensions Act 1959.

Personal life 
He married Maraget Sarah Atcheson in 1938; they had no children.

Contributions to legal thought
He made many contributions to legal thought and pushed the law in new and unique directions, not least UK courts without juries ('Diplock courts)'. His rulings, especially those on administrative law, are often considered as authoritative not only in England but across the Commonwealth and even in the United States, where he has been cited by the Supreme Court.

Examples include Council of Civil Service Unions v Minister for the Civil Service [1984] UKHL 9 or R (National Federation of Self-Employed and Small Businesses Ltd) v Inland Revenue Commissioners [1982] A.C. 617, on grounds of review and locus standi respectively.

He also made important contributions to contract law.

The current typology of grounds for judicial review is owing to Lord Diplock.

Procedural impropriety
Nemo judex (Bias rule)
Audi alteram partem (Hearing rule)
Illegality
Ultra vires
Simple ultra vires
Extended ultra vires
Procedural ultra vires
Fettering
Irrationality
Wednesbury irrationality
Lack of proportionality
 Innominate Terms
 Primary and Secondary Obligations

Notable judgments

High Court 

 Silkin v Beaverbrook Newspapers Ltd [1958] 1 WLR 743

Court of Appeal 

 Hong Kong Fir Shipping Co Ltd v Kawasaki Kisen Kaisha Ltd [1962] 2 QB 26
 Boulting v Association of Cinematograph, Television and Allied Technicians [1963] 2 QB 606
 BBC v Johns [1965] Ch 32
 Letang v Cooper [1965] 1 QB 232
 United Dominions Trust Ltd v Kirkwood [1966] 2 QB 431

House of Lords 

 Pettitt v Pettitt [1970] AC 777
 Dorset Yacht Co Ltd v Home Office [1970] AC 1004
 Gissing v Gissing [1971] AC 886
 Re Vandervell Trustees Ltd [1971] AC 912
 American Cyanamid Co v Ethicon Ltd [1975] AC 396
 Ayerst (Inspector of Taxes) v C&K (Construction) Ltd [1976] AC 167
 Erven Warnink BV v J Townend & Sons (Hull) Ltd [1979] AC 731
 Gibson v Manchester City Council [1979] 1 WLR 294
 Whitehouse v Lemon; Whitehouse v Gay News Ltd [1979] 2 WLR 281
 IRC v Burmah Oil Co. Ltd 1982 SC (HL) 114
 Catnic Components Ltd v Hill & Smith Ltd [1982] RPC 183
 Universe Tankships Inc. of Monrovia v. International Transport Workers' Federation [1983] 1 AC 366
 R v Miller [1983] 2 AC 161
 Cheall v APEX [1983] 2 AC 180
 O'Reilly v Mackman [1983] 2 AC 237
 R v Sullivan [1984] AC 156
 Council of Civil Service Unions v Minister for the Civil Service [1985] AC 374
 Harvela Investments Ltd v Royal Trust of Canada (CI) Ltd [1986] AC 207

Judicial Committee of the Privy Council 

 Ong Ah Chuan v Public Prosecutor [1981] AC 648
 Mitchell v DPP [1986] AC 73

Arms

See also
Judicial review in English law
Air New Zealand Flight 901

References

External links
 Report of the Commission to Consider Legal Procedures to deal with Terrorist Activities in Northern Ireland
 Parliamentary Archives, Papers of William, Lord Diplock

1907 births
1985 deaths
20th-century English judges
Law lords
Alumni of University College, Oxford
People educated at Whitgift School
Members of the Judicial Committee of the Privy Council
People from Croydon
Members of the Middle Temple
20th-century King's Counsel
Senior Lords of Appeal in Ordinary
Members of the Privy Council of the United Kingdom
Lords Justices of Appeal
Knights Bachelor
Queen's Bench Division judges